In Tibetan cuisine, Zhoixo is wild ginseng, made with yogurt.

See also
 List of Tibetan dishes
 List of yogurt-based dishes and beverages

References

Tibetan cuisine
Yogurt-based dishes